Logic Group of Schools is a privately owned day and boarding school located in Lagos State, south-western Nigeria. It was established in September 1999. The school has two arms, namely its primary and secondary schools.

The school is categorized into Primary 1–6, Junior and Senior Secondary School. As part of the programs of the school, the students are prepared and registered for WASSCE conducted by the West African Examinations Council (WAEC).

External links
 Official Website

Secondary schools in Lagos State